Adeline Georgiana Isabel Kingscote (pseudonyms, Lucas Cleeve and Mrs Howard Kingscote; 1862–1908) was an English novelist, the author of over sixty works including The Woman Who Wouldn't in 1895. After her marriage to Colonel Howard Kingscote, most of her novels were published under the name Mrs Howard Kingscote.

Life
Adeline Georgiana Isabel Wolff was born in 1862. She was the only daughter of Henry Drummond Wolff, a diplomat and Conservative MP. Recorded in Who's Who as a traveller and linguist, she compiled a book of Indian folklore, Tales of the Sun, or, Folklore of Southern India, and a work entitled The English Baby in India and How to Rear it. However she was best known as a novelist.

Her most famous novel was a response to Grant Allen's The Woman Who Did. The first edition of Cleeve's The Woman Who Wouldn't (1895) sold well but received hostile reviews. She said of this:

One of her sons, Algernon Kingscote, became a notable tennis player.

She died in Château-d'Œx, Switzerland, 1908.

References

External links 
 Mrs Adeline Kingscote (Lucas Cleeve)
Works by or about Lucas Cleeve at HathiTrust
 

1862 births
1908 deaths
19th-century English novelists
19th-century English women writers
English people of German-Jewish descent
English women novelists
British folklorists
Women folklorists
Pseudonymous women writers
19th-century pseudonymous writers